Baqeleh (also Romanized as Bāqeleh; also known as Bāgeleh and Baghla) is a village in Qarah Su Rural District, in the Central District of Kermanshah County, Kermanshah Province, Iran. At the 2006 census, its population was 163, in 34 families.

References 

Populated places in Kermanshah County